The Southern Fuegian Railway or the Train of the End of the World is a  gauge steam railway in Tierra del Fuego Province, Argentina. It was originally built as a freight line to serve the prison of Ushuaia, specifically to transport timber. It now operates as a heritage railway into the Tierra del Fuego National Park and is considered the southernmost functioning railway in the world.

History

Origins

 century, Ushuaia on Isla Grande de Tierra del Fuego developed as a penal colony, with the first prisoners arriving in 1884. In 1902, work began on a proper set of buildings for the prison by inmates, and a railway on wooden rails was constructed to assist the transport of materials, mainly local rock, sand and timber. In 1909, the prison governor informed the government of the need to upgrade the line and Decauville tracks at a  narrow gauge were laid in 1909 and 1910 for use with a steam locomotive. They connected the prison camp with the forestry camp and passed along the shoreline in front of the growing town of Ushuaia. It was known as the 'Train of the Prisoners' (Tren de los Presos) and brought wood for heating and cooking as well as building.

The railway was gradually extended further into the forest into more remote areas as wood was exhausted. It followed the valley of the Pipo River into the higher terrain. Constant building allowed expansion of the prison and of the town, with prisoners providing many services and goods.

In 1947 the prison was closed and replaced with a naval base. Two years later the 1949 Tierra del Fuego earthquake blocked much of the line. Nevertheless, the government made efforts to clear the line and put the train back in service despite the absence of the prisoners. However the service was not viable and closed in 1952.

Rebirth as a tourist railway
In 1994, the railway was rebuilt in  track gauge and began services again, although now in luxury relative to its origin as a prison train, with champagne and dinner services. A new 2-6-2T steam locomotive (Camila) was brought from England in 1995 with another made in Argentina and three diesel locomotives also serving on the line. Two garratts, in Porta's improved version, have also been procured.

Services leave from the 'End of the World' station (about 10 km west of Ushuaia's Airport and immediately west of the Ushuaia Golf Club). The route takes passengers along the Pico Valley in the Toro gorge and to Cascada de la Macarena station where visitors are able to learn about the Yámana people and climb to a viewpoint at a 15-minute stop. The train then enters the national park and the forest, travelling through the valley below the mountains, reaching El Parque station where tourists can return by coach or train.

There is a plan to extend the line to a new station closer to Ushuaia and connect the station to the city with a tram.

In popular culture
The train served as inspiration to singer Michale Graves in the song "Train to the End of the World" of his 2013 album Vagabond.

Gallery

See also

List of heritage railways

References

External links

 
 Map sources for the station at: 
 El tren del fin del mundo - trip report from 2010
 On the Ferrocarril Austral Fueguino (FCAF) "The Train at the End of the World" The Work of Shaun McMahon

Heritage railways in Argentina
Railway lines in Argentina
Railway companies of Argentina
Tourist attractions in Tierra del Fuego Province, Argentina
500 mm gauge railways in Argentina
Ushuaia
Transport in Tierra del Fuego Province, Argentina